Caloptilia oriarcha is a moth of the family Gracillariidae. It is known from Peru.

References

oriarcha
Moths of South America
Moths described in 1915